Richmond Main Street Station, officially the Main Street Station and Trainshed, is a historic railroad station and office building in Richmond, Virginia. It was built in 1901, and is served by Amtrak. It is also an intermodal station with Richmond's city transit bus services, which are performed by Greater Richmond Transit Company (GRTC). It is colloquially known by people from the city as The Clock Tower. It is a U.S. National Historic Landmark. Main Street Station serves as a secondary train station for Richmond providing limited Amtrak service directly to downtown Richmond. Several Amtrak trains serving the Richmond metropolitan area only stop at the area's primary rail station, Staples Mill Road which is located five miles to the north in Henrico County.

Since 2018, the station has also been a stop along the GRTC Pulse bus rapid transit line.

History 

Richmond's Main Street Station in the downtown area was built in 1901 by the Seaboard Air Line Railroad (SAL) and the Chesapeake and Ohio Railway (C&O). Seaboard had introduced service to Richmond, and C&O had consolidated the former Virginia Central Railroad and the Richmond and Allegheny Railroad, which had previously maintained separate stations.

The ornate Main Street Station was designed by the Philadelphia firm of Wilson, Harris, and Richards in the Second Renaissance Revival style. In the 1950s, Seaboard shifted its Richmond passenger service to Broad Street Station (now the Science Museum of Virginia), but C&O maintained offices in the upper floors, and its passenger service continued at Main Street Station until Amtrak took over in 1971.

Major long distance passenger train services in the mid and late 1960s included:
Chesapeake and Ohio trains west to Louisville, Cincinnati and Detroit:
Fast Flying Virginian
George Washington
Sportsman
Seaboard Air Line (and from 1967 to 1971 Seaboard Coast Line) to Birmingham and Florida:
Silver Comet
Silver Meteor
Silver Star

In 1970, Main Street Station and its trainshed, one of the last surviving trainsheds of its type in the nation, were added to the National Register of Historic Places. In 1976 it was designated a National Historic Landmark.

Amtrak took over most intercity passenger train service in the United States on May 1, 1971, including trains to Main Street Station. In 1972, Hurricane Agnes caused the James River to flood the station. The damage was so severe that in 1975, Amtrak moved its Richmond stops to Richmond Staples Mill Road, a much smaller suburban station in Henrico County, five miles north of downtown. To make matters worse, the station was damaged by fires in 1976 and 1983.

Service restoration

Main Street Station reopened to Amtrak service on December 18, 2003, following renovations.

In 2018, the station became a stop on the GRTC Bus Rapid Transit's Broad and Main Street Line. There are also plans for Main Street Station to become an intermodal station with Richmond's city bus services operated by GRTC, a public service company owned jointly by the City of Richmond and Chesterfield County.

Local officials hoped to increase the number of trains stopping at Main Street Station by extending services that otherwise terminate at Staples Mill station in suburban Henrico County. The completion of a bypass around Acca Yard in March 2019 was a step in this direction, although the first additional service that it enabled—a second Northeast Regional round trip to Norfolk—did not serve Main Street Station.

On September 27, 2021, two Amtrak trains—one northbound in the morning and the other southbound in the evening—were extended from Staples Mill to Main Street Station as the first part of Virginia's multi-billion dollar rail expansion program.

Proposed future

The 2017 Draft Environmental Impact Report of the DC2RVA project recommended routing all trains that serve Staples Mill station through Main Street Station, while maintaining full service to Staples Mill. Other considered alternatives had involved closing one of the two stations, or replacing both with a single station at Boulevard or Broad Street.

Main Street Station is located on the Southeast High Speed Rail Corridor (SEHSR), a passenger rail transportation project planned to connect with the existing high speed rail corridor from Boston, Massachusetts to Washington, D.C., known as the Northeast Corridor (served by Amtrak's Acela Express and Northeast Regional services and many commuter railroads) and extend similar high speed passenger rail services south through Richmond and Petersburg in Virginia through Raleigh and Charlotte in North Carolina. Since first established in 1992, the U.S. Department of Transportation (USDOT) has since extended the corridor to Atlanta and Macon, Georgia; Columbia, South Carolina; Jacksonville, Florida; and Birmingham, Alabama.

Station layout 
The station is served by three daily Northeast Regional trains, two of which originate or terminate at Newport News. The other train originates/terminates at Richmond Main Street Station. Northbound trains provide direct service to Union Station in Washington, Pennsylvania Station in New York, and South Station in Boston, among other stops.

See also

Broad Street Station
Transportation in Richmond, Virginia
List of National Historic Landmarks in Virginia
National Register of Historic Places listings in Richmond, Virginia

References

External links

Article in Railway Age (1899) with floor plans

National Historic Landmarks in Virginia
Amtrak stations in Virginia
Buildings and structures in Richmond, Virginia
Transportation in Richmond, Virginia
GRTC Pulse stations
2018 establishments in Virginia
Railway stations in the United States opened in 1901
R
R
Railway stations on the National Register of Historic Places in Virginia
Bus stations in Virginia
Beaux-Arts architecture in Virginia
Renaissance Revival architecture in Virginia
Clock towers in Virginia
National Register of Historic Places in Richmond, Virginia
Historic American Buildings Survey in Virginia
Historic American Engineering Record in Virginia
Railroad-related National Historic Landmarks
Transport infrastructure completed in 2018